Zhang Lijun is the name of:

Zhang Lijun (politician) (born 1952), Chinese politician
Zhang Lijun (sitting volleyball) (born 1985), Chinese sitting volleyball player
Zhang Lijun (curler) (born 1996), Chinese curler